Jon Penington (1922–1997) was a British screenwriter and film producer.

Selected filmography
 At the Stroke of Nine (1957)
 The Man Who Liked Funerals (1959)
 The Crowning Touch (1959)
 In the Wake of a Stranger (1959)
 Expresso Bongo (1959)
 Zoo Baby (1960)
 The Mouse that Roared (1959)
 Faces in the Dark (1960)
 The Shadow of the Cat (1961)
 The Valiant (1962)
 The Comedy Man (1964)
 The Liquidator (1965)
 Till Death Us Do Part (1969)

References

External links

1922 births
1997 deaths
British male screenwriters
British film producers
20th-century British screenwriters